William Urban is an American historian specializing in the Baltic Crusades and Teutonic knights. He is the Lee L. Morgan Professor of History and International studies at Monmouth College. He served as an editor for the Journal of Baltic Studies from 1990 to 1994. Prior to beginning his teaching career at Monmouth College in 1966, he taught as an assistant professor at the University of Kansas 1965-1966.

References

21st-century American historians
21st-century American male writers
Living people
Historians of the Crusades
Academic journal editors
Monmouth College faculty
Place of birth missing (living people)
University of Kansas faculty
1939 births
American male non-fiction writers